Celtic Family Magazine was a Los Angeles, California-based print and electronic publication, serving Celtic communities and their descendants around the world. Celtic Family Magazine published special features and articles on art, history, culture, entertainment, and lifestyle. Celtic Family Magazine was produced by A Raven Above Press and was distributed throughout North America and select areas of the United Kingdom.

It was announced through social media that after four years of publication Celtic Family Magazine would be going on hiatus starting in 2017.

Featured Interviews
Interviews with notable Celts in various fields, and conducted by the editors of Celtic Family Magazine included:
 Bagad Kemper
 Barrule
 Johanna Basford
 Chris Connelly
 Cathy Davey
 Diana Gabaldon
 Meinir Gwilym
 Shani Rhys James
 Ruarri Joseph
 Ruth Keggin
 Eimear McBride
 Paddy Moloney
 Siobhan Owen
 Owen Sheers
 Maggie Stiefvater
 The Once
 The Outside Track
 Jack Vettriano

Featured Articles
Articles about notable Celts in history, and conducted by the editors of Celtic Family Magazine included:

 J.M. Barrie
 Laurence Binyon
 Bartholomew Roberts
 Roald Dahl
 Eddie Foy, Sr.
 Owain Glyndŵr
 Eirian Llwyd

 Jim Morrison
 Redmond O'Hanlon
 Grace O'Malley
 John Petts
 Bram Stoker
 Dylan Thomas

Celtic Family Magazine Readers' Choice Awards
2015 Award Recipients

Notable contributors and their departments

 Lorin Morgan-Richards: Publisher and Editor-in-chief
 Kate Cowie Riley: Copy Editor and Lead Contributing Writer
 Sarah Hope: Arts Editor
 Nichola Hope: Arts Editor
 Valerie Stoneking: Beauty and Fashion Editor
 Maegan Langer: History and Mythology Editor
 Zoe Gladwin: Photographer
 Brian Pierce: Photographer and Contributor
 Betsy Baytos: Contributor
 Liisa Linklater: Contributor

 Cath Barton: Literature Editor (2013-2016)
 Amanda Shepherd: Dining Editor (2014-2015)
 Jason Shepherd: Cultural Editor (2013-2015)
 Peter Anthony Freeman: History and Mythology Editor (2013-2015)
 Dawn Morgan Fatheree: Contributor

See also
List of literary magazines

Notes and references

External links
 

2013 establishments in California
2017 disestablishments in California
History magazines published in the United States
Breton American
Celtic Revival
Celtic culture
United States
Cornish-American history
Defunct literary magazines published in the United States
Ethnic music in the United States
European-American culture in Los Angeles
Irish-American culture
Magazines established in 2013
Magazines disestablished in 2017
Magazines published in Los Angeles
Manx American
Scotch-Irish American history
Scottish-American culture
Welsh-American history